The Doctor, an Emergency Medical Hologram (or EMH for short), is a fictional character portrayed by actor Robert Picardo on the television series Star Trek: Voyager, which aired on UPN between 1995 and 2001. He is an artificial intelligence manifesting as a holographic projection, designed to act as a short-term supplement to the medical staff of a starship during emergency situations. However, when the starship Voyager is stranded on the far side of the galaxy with no surviving medical personnel, he is forced to act as the ship's chief medical officer for several years. In an example of the Star Trek franchise's exploration of artificial intelligence, a simple software program becomes a major character in the show.

Casting
In a 2020 interview, Picardo said his agent told him that he was selected from 900 actors who auditioned for the role.

He added that he first learned what a hologram was from being selected for the role. "I was confused, I didn’t know what it meant for him to be a hologram or a computer program. I didn’t understand enough about Star Trek 'science,' which is based on real science, although we still don’t know how to make a hologram with density. So I got the part without knowing at all what I was in for."

Picardo initially auditioned for Neelix. Despite Ethan Phillips' getting the part, Picardo was asked by the producers to come back and audition for The Doctor — something that shocked him, because usually actors would be passed over completely. During his audition for the role of The Doctor, Picardo was asked only to say, "Somebody forgot to terminate my program." However, he then ad libbed, "I'm a doctor, not a nightlight!" (Picardo was initially afraid that he might have ruined his chances—ad libbing, he explained, was something that one just "did not do" in an audition.)

Depiction
The Doctor began his service on the USS Voyager as the standard Emergency Medical Hologram built into almost every newer Starfleet ship's sickbay. The EMH is to be used should the ship's doctor be incapacitated or require emergency assistance. In the series' first episode, Voyagers chief medical officer, along with his nurse, are killed, necessitating extended use of the EMH. The EMH eventually developed his own personality, although he generally maintained his acerbic wit and irritating "version one" bedside manner. As he was originally intended as a temporary medical backup system, not as a digital life form, Voyagers journey strains his programming to some limits. He gave himself a name during episode S1E12 Heroes and Demons, “Schweitzer”. This name did not carry the whole series. The Doctor becomes the chief medical officer, with Kes and Tom Paris at various times acting as nurses. 

Attempting to develop a realistic personality, the Doctor not only manufactured a holographic family ("Real Life"), he also had an increasing number of other "human" experiences. This resulted in the Doctor's program evolving to become more lifelike, with emotions and ambitions. He developed meaningful and complex relationships with many members of the ship's crew. The Doctor also developed talents as a playwright, artist, and photographer, and even became a connoisseur of opera. He has had multiple other experiences with "family", including having had a son with a "roommate" while trapped on a planet for three years. During the episode "Blink of an Eye", he asked an associate to inquire further about his progeny.

A recurring theme was the ethical aspects of an artificial, yet apparently sentient, being. In the episode "Latent Image", treating two patients with an equal chance of survival, with only enough time to treat one, The Doctor chose Harry Kim, a friend. The other patient, Ensign Jetal, died. The Doctor was overwhelmed with guilt, believing that his friendship influenced his choice. When the stress nearly led to his program breaking down, Captain Janeway had his memories of these events deleted. When The Doctor later discovered clues as to what had happened, Captain Janeway was convinced by him and others that he had a right to learn to come to grips with the guilt in the manner of any other sentient being rather than be treated merely as a defective piece of equipment.

The Doctor submitted a holonovel titled Photons Be Free to a publisher on Earth, detailing the manner in which holograms were sometimes treated by Starfleet. His characters were closely based on Voyagers crew, but exaggerated to appear more intense and vicious, creating fears among the crew their reputations would be ruined. Tom Paris convinced The Doctor to make adjustments without sacrificing his theme. The Doctor lacked legal rights as Federation law did not classify him as a "sentient being". Thus he was forbidden to make any subsequent changes to the holonovel. Captain Janeway's efforts resulted in The Doctor being accorded the status of "artist", although not a "person". This permitted him to rewrite the novel. Four months later, it was known throughout the Alpha Quadrant as a very thought-provoking piece of work. Several other EMHs, now relegated to mining duty, experienced the novel.

The Doctor's standard greeting was "Please state the nature of the medical emergency" when activated, though later modified to say whatever he chose. In "Jetrel", it was revealed that he was given the ability to activate and deactivate himself.

The Doctor later acquired a mobile holographic emitter from the 29th century ("Future's End"). Although he had previously been confined to Sickbay or the Holodeck, the mobile emitter allowed The Doctor to move about freely, making him ideal for missions where the environment would be harmful or otherwise fatal to the crew. In one notable incident, when an away team was trapped on a radioactive planet, The Doctor was able to infiltrate the people and almost single-handedly rescue the team because, as he pointed out, being a hologram renders him immune to the radiation, stating that "being a hologram does have its advantages."

In a 2020 interview, Picardo recalled his initial reticence to the concept of a mobile emitter:

The Doctor's programming evolved from his first romance, Dr. Denara Pel, to the point where he fell in love with Seven of Nine, though she was unable to reciprocate. In an alternate future episode, "Endgame", The Doctor finally adopts a name (see below) and marries a human female named Lana.

In the final episode of Star Trek: Voyager, a future version of Janeway also informs him of his later invention of a device known as a 'synaptic transceiver', something that fascinates The Doctor; he's cut off by the 'present' Janeway, who is abiding by the Temporal Prime Directive, before he can learn more.

Emergency Command Hologram 
The "Emergency Command Hologram", aka "ECH", is first coined by The Doctor in the episode "Tinker, Tenor, Doctor, Spy", in which he creates a program which allows him to daydream, such as adding routines which allow him to take command of Voyager – including a command uniform – in the event of the command crew being incapacitated. At the end of the episode, Captain Janeway promises to consider the idea. In the following season episode "Workforce", the idea is realized when the crew is forced to abandon ship, and The Doctor takes over command functions.

Backup copies
The Doctor's program required a custom-built photonic processor, and Starfleet outfitted Voyager with only two. This hardware itself also could not be replicated, hence the Doctor could not be easily backed up, restored, or copied.

Voyager'''s computers could not help run his photonic program, and could not contain a usable backup of its image. The Doctor's entire program used 50 million gigaquads ("Lifesigns" and "The Swarm" mention these limitations). The episode "Living Witness" depicts a future Delta Quadrant civilization building a museum around Voyager artifacts, including its redundant EMH photonic processor.

Name
A recurring theme in the Doctor's life was his lack of a proper name. Starfleet did not assign a name to him, and initially, the Doctor claimed that he did not want one until the episode "Eye of the Needle", when he asks Kes to give him a name. He later adopted such names as "Schweitzer" (after Albert Schweitzer); "Shmullus" (in "Lifesigns" by Vidiian patient Dr. Denara Pel); "Van Gogh"; "Kenneth"; "Jones"; and several others. His friends suggest the famous historical Earth doctors "Galen" and "Spock." The captioned dialog of early episodes, and early promotional material for the series premiere, referred to him as 'Dr. Zimmerman', after his creator, Lewis Zimmerman. The Doctor is ultimately referred to as simply "The Doctor" and addressed as "Doctor" or "Doc", which he answers to without concern, and the issue of the Doctor's name virtually disappears over the course of the series. However, in the series finale, in an alternate future timeline the Doctor has finally chosen the name "Joe" after his new wife's grandfather, and Picardo's own father. (Tom Paris remarked in "Endgame" that "it took you 33 years to come up with "Joe"?").

Characteristics
Before the arrival of the mobile emitter, The Doctor's holo-program was confined to sickbay, holodecks, and other areas equipped with holographic systems.

Depending on the availability of suitable holographic patterns and the capacity of his pattern buffers, The Doctor can alter his appearance. This was illustrated especially in the episode "Renaissance Man."

The Doctor is also able to download his program and personality subroutines into a humanoid with Borg implants, indirectly "possessing" that individual and gaining control over its "host" body. Such was the case when he was forced to hide within the body of Seven of Nine in "Body and Soul".

Emergency Medical Hologram
The EMH is a holographic computer program designed to treat patients during emergency situations, or when the regular medical staff is unavailable or incapacitated. EMHs are a standard feature onboard all Starfleet ships, but they are there only to supplement the living medical crew during emergencies, not replace it. Programmed with all current Starfleet medical knowledge, The Doctor and all Mark I programs are equipped with the knowledge and mannerisms of historic Federation doctors, as well as the physical appearance of their programmer Dr. Lewis Zimmerman. However, the EMH can form a personality over time if used a lot.

Other appearances

Picardo had a minor role in the movie Star Trek: First Contact, where he played the emergency medical hologram of the USS Enterprise-E. Doctor Beverly Crusher activates him, albeit reluctantly, as a means of distracting the Borg while she and other crew members escape from the besieged sickbay. He replies, "I'm a doctor, not a doorstop", an homage to Doctor McCoy's catchphrase line "I'm a doctor, not a ..."

Picardo appeared as Zimmerman in the Star Trek: Deep Space Nine episode "Doctor Bashir I Presume", in which he was attempting to develop a new Long-Term Medical Hologram. The EMH also appeared in the defunct Star Trek: The Experience amusement exhibition at the Las Vegas Hilton. 

In 2019, Picardo said CBS producers had expressed interest in having him appear in Star Trek: Picard, as either The Doctor or his creator, Lewis Zimmerman, whom Picardo also portrayed.

Several other versions of the EMH have appeared onscreen. The EMH Mark II, a new and upgraded EMH is played by Andy Dick in the Voyager episode "Message in a Bottle". Star Trek: Picard features an EMH called "Emil", part of a holographic suite aboard the ship La Sirena, modeled after Captain Cristobal Rios and played by Santiago Cabrera. Star Trek: Discovery features a 32nd-century EMH known as "Eli", played by Brendan Beiser.

Reception
In 2018, The Wrap ranked Voyager's EMH as the 22nd best character of Star Trek overall, noting the character as a "sarcastic, overworked hologram", one that also had time for jokes and helping fellow crewmates.

In 2016, Wired magazine ranked the character as the 16th most important character in service to Starfleet within the Star Trek science fiction universe.

In 2016, SyFy ranked "The Doctor/Voyager EMH" as the second best of the six main-cast space doctors of the Star Trek franchise.

In 2013, Slate magazine ranked The Doctor one of the ten best crew characters in the Star Trek franchise.

See also

Elementary, Dear Data (TNG S2E3 aired December 5, 1988 - also explored holographic A.I.)
Vic Fontaine (a holographic personality on Star Trek: Deep Space Nine)
Arnold Rimmer, holographic character on Red Dwarf''.

Notes

External links

 The Doctor at StarTrek.com

Television characters introduced in 1995
Fictional artificial intelligences
Fictional physicians
Fictional surgeons
Fictional medical personnel
Fictional singers
Fictional writers
Fictional characters who can turn intangible
Fictional people from the 24th-century
Star Trek: Voyager characters
Holography in television
Starfleet medical personnel
Fictional characters without a name